An ita-bag (also ita bag or itabag;) is a handbag, backpack or other kind of bag covered in badges, buttons, figurines and other merchandise pertaining to anime and manga fandom. In Japan, ita-bags are a popular piece of apparel among female anime and manga fans.

Ita-bags began to appear in Japanese popular culture in the 2010s, and were covered by national news beginning in 2015. They have themselves been depicted in anime, e.g. in Shōnen Hollywood (2014). Although usually individually put together by the owner, ita-bags can also be purchased ready-made in otaku shops. These stores also often partner with game centers to create ita-bag contests. Spread through the international anime and manga fandom, the ita-bag fashion is also growing outside Japan.

Ita-bags serve to publicly express how much their owners love a particular fictional character or media franchise. In that respect, they are the equivalent of itasha, "painmobiles", which are cars covered with fandom-themed stickers and decals. In both cases, the "pain" refers to the pain inflicted on the bag or car, and to the owner's wallet. Ita-bags are an expensive hobby, given that some buttons are of a limited edition and command high prices. Some fans spend more than the equivalent of a thousand U.S. dollars on their ita-bags. When creating ita-bags, fans often "buy the same item many times."

References

Anime and manga fandom
Bags (fashion)
Japanese fashion
Anime and manga terminology